Carshalton was a constituency combining with areas to the south-west, then to the east instead, Carshalton which is a suburb on a long, north–south hillside south of London. The latter form saw it take up an eastern "half" (i.e. one of two divisions) of the London Borough of Sutton.  It returned one Member of Parliament (MP)  to the House of Commons of the Parliament of the United Kingdom.

It was created for the 1945 general election having been the south-west of "Mitcham" and on shedding Banstead in 1974 it gained what had been the south-east of the Mitcham seat, then was abolished for the 1983 general election, when it was replaced by Carshalton and Wallington, a nearly identical eastern set of 13 wards of its (post-1965) solely related local government area (London Borough).

Boundaries

1945–1974: The Urban Districts of Banstead and Carshalton.
Note: abolished as entities from April 1965, falling into Surrey County Council and the London Borough of Sutton respectively

1974–1983: The London Borough of Sutton wards of Beddington North, Beddington South, Carshalton Central, Carshalton North East, Carshalton North West, Carshalton St Helier North, Carshalton St Helier South, Carshalton St Helier West, Carshalton South East, Carshalton South West, Wallington Central, Wallington North, and Wallington South.

Members of Parliament

1983: constituency abolished: see Carshalton and Wallington

Election results

Elections in the 1940s

Elections in the 1950s

Elections in the 1960s

Elections in the 1970s

References

See also
As to 1945-1965 period: list of parliamentary constituencies in Surrey

Parliamentary constituencies in London (historic)
Constituencies of the Parliament of the United Kingdom established in 1945
Constituencies of the Parliament of the United Kingdom disestablished in 1983
Politics of the London Borough of Sutton
Carshalton